Sano Sansar (translation: Small World) is a 2008 Nepali romantic comedy film directed by Alok Nembang. The film has a massive star cast which includes Neer Shah and newcomers Mahesh Shakya (popularly known Karma), Jiwan Luitel and Namrata Shrestha. Sano Sansar is director Alok Nembang's directorial debut and is the second Nepali HD movie made after Kagbeni. The film is heavily influenced by the Korean movie My Sassy Girl and the English-language movie You've Got Mail. In 2021, Sano Sansar was shown again in theaters after COVID-19 lockdown ended in the country, it was after 13 years of its official release date it was shown again in some of the theaters. They took this decision in order to bring back audience to the theaters, because producers were not ready to release their unreleased films in fear of losing potential audience, since they were unsure if people are ready to attend theater after long pandemic.

Cast 
 Karma Shakya: Ravi
 Jiwan Luitel: Siza
 Namrata Shrestha: Reetu
 Vinay Shrestha: Suraj
 Sushila Rayamajhi: Sarita
 Neer Shah: Police Officer
 Arjun Shrestha: Dr. Chandra Thapa
 Puskar Gurung: Lodge Owner
 Bholaraj Sapkota: Go-kart Mechanic
Melina Manandhar: Special Appearance

Soundtrack

Reception
Sano Sansar was able to leave its mark on Nepali audiences that had begun to avoid Nepali language films due to its incomparable reputation with films from other industries. Because of that, audiences were leaning more towards Hindi language films (Bollywood). Despite having to face this challenge, Sano Sansar was able to perform very well in box office, in fact it was able to make record by earning 6.25 lakh Nepalese rupees within eight days of release.

Sano Sansar was received with positive reviews. Kathmandu Post gave very good ratings calling it "a great relief from the all time dhisum dhisum fight scenes and ghintang ghintang rhythmic songs of Nepali films".

The musical aspect of this film was also highly appreciated and the title track composed by Sachin Singh and sung by Babu Bogati became highly popular among youngsters.

See also

Cinema of Nepal
List of Nepalese films

References

External links

 Sano Sansar's Official Website

2008 films
2008 romantic comedy films
Nepalese romantic comedy films
2000s Nepali-language films
Remakes of Nepalese films
2008 directorial debut films